Count Gyula Széchényi de Sárvár-Felsővidék (11 November 1829, Vienna – 13 January 1921, Budapest) was a Hungarian politician, who served as Minister besides the King between 1900 and 1903. Széchényi was 70 years old when appointed by Kálmán Széll.

Family
He married Countess Karolina Zichy-Ferraris de Zich et Vásonkeő (1845–1871) on 6 July 1863. They had four children. His second wife was Paola Klinkosch (1851–1901), they married on 3 February 1875. They had one child.
 Count Andor Pál Széchényi (1864–1943) married, firstly, Countess Andrea Csekonics on 13 October 1894. He married, secondly, Baroness Mária Szegedy-Ensch on 25 March 1925. He had three children.
 Countess Margit Széchényi (1866–1915) married Eugen Graf von Kesselstatt on 20 April 1892 at Opatija, Croatia. They had seven children.
 Countess Karolina Széchényi (1869–1932) married Simon Graf von Wimpffen on 30 May 1890. They had no children.
 Countess Paulina Széchényi (1871–1945) married Aloys Lexa Graf von Aehrenthal on 22 July 1902. They had three children.
 Count Gyula József Pál Széchényi (1878–1956) married Gizella Haas von Teichen on 8 December 1908. They had four children.

References

External links
 Országgyűlési Almanach Főrendiház (1887)

1829 births
1921 deaths
Foreign ministers of Hungary
Gyula, Szechenyi
Knights of the Golden Fleece of Austria